Yeh Zindagi Hai is a Pakistani Urdu language comedy-drama television series that premiered on Geo Entertainment in 2008. It initially starred Javeria Saud, Saud, Moammar Rana, Hina Dilpazeer, and Sana in prominent roles. The series became one of the longest-running television series in the history of Pakistani television and ran for six and a half years until its end in late 2013. Yeh Zindagi Hai was hugely popular from its inception, making the leading actress Javeria Saud an overnight star. The series took frequent time-leaps during its run. It completed more than 300 episodes which are now rerun on Geo Kahani.

Plot

Episode 1-100

Background 
The story is about a middle-class family, sisters Saeeda and Bano, and their children. Saeeda has two daughters, Hajira and Jameela, and a son named Bhola who marries their neighbor's daughter (Nargis) without permission from the family. Bano only has one child, a son named Jamal. Jamal has liked Jameela since childhood but Jameela likes Momi. Saeeda asks Jameela for dowry for Hajra's wedding, enraging Jameela.

Jamila's love 
A woman whose son is being tutored by Jameela (Sana), fires Jameela after her son discovers the affair between Momi and Jameela.

Jamila's TV Working 
Jameela contacts Majid's friend (Kamal) who works at a TV channel but a misunderstanding develops in the house and Jameela leaves. Kamal takes her to a Kotha rather than a TV channel.

Scenes of Kotha 
In the Kotha, an angry supervisor told Jamila that she would never go back home, as everyone who comes here has no door to return.

Entrance of Shirazi 
There, she meets Shirazi who had come to see the Mujra. Shirazi, a rich man with business in Dubai and Pakistan, has a daughter named Jannat.  Jannat is raised by Shirazi's aunt, a woman named Sultana. He helps her to escape from that Kotha.

Jamila's Return Home 
Jamila thanked Shairazi for helping her. As she was gone for so many days, her family thought Jamila had run away from home with someone. Shairazi takes Jamila home, but when they see her with Shairazi they question why she came back and tell her to leave. Due to the bad situation Shairazi lies that he has married Jamila, which causes Jamila's mother to beat her. Falling into his arms, Shairazi takes Jamila to his car while Jamal watched and told them no one would believe them.

Jamila and Shairazi's wedding 
Shairazi takes Jamila to his home and tells Sultana that today she is a guest and from tomorrow she will be the owner of this house. Jamila was surprised to see the much too huge house. Shairazi introduced Jamila to Sultana and her daughter. Jamila was unhappy, and confused about whether to marry Shairazi or not, but Sultana convinces her. Sultana tells Jamila that 1 year ago, Shairazi's wife had died but he is a very kind man who she should marry. Then Sultana told Shairazi to take some time for marriage, as every girl has opinions about the arrangements of her marriage and then Shairazi agrees with her. Jamila was on the terrace listening to their talk, and she says there is no need to delay their marriage as she was happy to marry Shairazi after seeing his extreme wealth. She asked Shairazi why Sultana was saying this, suspicious that she doesn't want them to marry. He tells her that she only heard half of their talk explains what Sultana was actually saying. He gave her money for shopping and when she sees a mall for the first time and was very happy. They get married after several days.

Death of Nargis's Child/Jamila's Divorce 
Nargis loses her child because of Hajira; her mother takes her back. Shirazi is fed up with Jameela's behavior. He finds out about Jameela's affair with Jamal through Bhola and he divorces her. Jameela blames her mother for this. Saeeda tries for Bhola's second marriage, but Nargis comes back to him.

Jamila's Second Marriage to Jamal 
Jamal causes drama to marry his stepmother's daughter Pinki. Pinki advises him to marry Jameela. Hajira gets married to Majid; after Hajira's marriage, Saeeda feels Jameela's pain. Jamal proposes to Jameela and she tells him the entire story about Kotha and her married life with Shirazi. Jamal realizes how selfish and senseless they were. Jameela agrees to marriage after many hindrances.

Fight with Jameela 
Jamal and Jamila have a fight and Jamal leaves home to live with Pinki.

People on Rent 
The story of people renting the upper floor of Saeeda's house. They were two women, Hazoori who came from a mehal and her sister Dil Araam, and their mother's brother Mammon Hazoor. It is a story of the poor condition of all people and the sadnesses of Saeeda and her renters.

Shairazi Marries Dil Aram/Jamila Re-marries Shairazi  

Now that Shairazi and Jamila were alone, Jamila was pregnant. She decided for the good future of her child, to divorce Jamal and re-marry Shairazi. As he helps Jameela and her family, she goes to his house and tells him that she wants to say something special. At the same time Shairazi says he does too, and Jamila tells him to go first.

Dil Araam's Love 
Then there was the sad story of Dil Araam. Her lover had gone away, leaving her alone, but he came back to say that he was sorry and wanted to marry her. Saeeda convinces her to marry her lover and she agrees.

Back to Hazoori Begum and Mamoon Hazoor
After Dil Araam's marriage, Hazoori and Mamoon Hazoor decide to live somewhere else.

Episodes 100-135 
Jamila's son (Bhola) grows up to become a taxi driver while Pinki's son (Kamal) grows up to become a pop-star.

Cast
Javeria Saud as Jamila/Chameli
Saud as Shirazi
Imran Urooj as Jamal; Jamila's cousin/love interest
Alyy Khan as Jalal Ahmad
Sidra Batool as Jannat "Jenny" Shirazi
Salma Zafar as Saeeda; Jamila's mother
Ismail Tara as Tara Qasai
Parveen Akbar as Bano; Jamal's mother
Naeema Garaj as Shakira; Saeeda's neighbor
Sherry Shah as Pinki; Jamal's love interest
Noman Habib as Bhola Jr; Jamila's only son
Fahad Mustafa as Bhola Sr; Jamila's brother
Beenish Chohan as Nargis; Bhola's love interest
Behroze Sabzwari as Laddan
Hina Dilpazeer as Hajira; Jamila's elder sister
Mehmood Qasmi as Majid; Hajira's husband
Sana Fakhar as Sana
Moammar Rana as Momi
Ghazala Jawaid as Paarvati; Pinki's mother
Adeel Chaudhry as Kam (Kamal)
Junaid Akhter as Salman 
Esha Noor as Jabbo
Momal Sheikh as Jalebi
Shahroz Sabzwari as Sheroz
Christina Albert as Saloni
Faizan as Rehan
Naveed Raza as Laddo
Zainab Qayyum as Dil Araam 
Sahir Lodhi as Sameer
Sangeeta as JB's wife's mother
Fareeda Shabbir as Joja; Laddan's wife
Ubaida Ansari as Kulsoom

Guest appearances 

 Majid Khan (2008)
 Humayun Saeed (2010–2011)
 Nida Yasir (2013)

Broadcast
Yeh Zindagi Hai aired every Sunday at 9:00 P.M on Geo TV. Yeh Zindagi Hai was also aired by Sony Entertainment Television Asia from November 2009, every Sunday at 8.00 P.M.

Reception
The series became popular due to the on-screen chemistry of real life couple Saud and Javeria Saud. Initially the series was praised for its unique plot and ensemble cast, but over the years the series ultimately received criticism due to its unrealistic and melodramatic tracks. In an interview with The Nation, when asked about the longterm popularity of the show, actress Javeria Saud commented, ''It is not that its popularity lessened with time. In this era in which we run after ratings and where dramas are turned down if they do not bring the required rating, Yeh Zindagi Hai continued to run for six and a half years at prime time. This is a proof of its consistent popularity.''

Controversy
In a 35-minute video released in mid-July 2020, Salma Zafar (Saeeda) revealed that she is still owed payment of approximately 1 crore by JJS Productions who have denied the allegations. Salma claimed that many additional artists/technicians from Yeh Zindagi Hai and Yeh Kaisi Mohabbat Hai also have yet to be paid for their work. After this announcement, Sherry Shah (Pinki) came to Salma's support, asking Javeria and Saud to clear her dues of approximately 90 lacs. However, Noman Habib (Bhola.Jr) denied the issue, reiterating that all dues from JJS Productions are clear.

References

External links
 http://vidpk.com/c/54/Yeh-Zindagi-Hai/
 http://www.apnapaktv.com/forumdisplay.php?35-Yeh-Zindagi-Hai
 http://www.desirulez.net/yeh-zindagi-hai/
http://www.videosliv.com/video/596/yeh-meri-zindagi-full-episode-20-saturday-october-28-2017-filmazia-entertainment/

rehan ali

Pakistani drama television series
Urdu-language television shows
Geo TV original programming
2008 Pakistani television series debuts
2010s Pakistani television series
2013 Pakistani television series endings
2000s Pakistani television series